Kodiveri Dam is located on the Bhavani river near Sathyamangalam in Tamil Nadu.

History
It was constructed by Kongalvan Vettuva Urali Gounder King in the year 1125 AD. Creating the dam consisted of carving a 20-foot wall of rock. The stones were then interlocked with iron bars and lead was used as mortar. These features, however, are not visible except in the dry season when the water level in the river drops considerably.

Hydrography
The dam is built on the Bhavani river. Two channels arise from the dam, Arakkankottai on the northern side of Bhavani river and Thadapalli on the southern side. Lands north of Gobichettipalayam are irrigated by Thadapalli channel and cultivation of sugarcane and paddies are predominant in this area.

Recreation
The dam is a popular tourist spot. The park, associated play area and coracle rides are the main attractions.

See also 
List of reservoirs and dams in India

References

External links 

Dams in Tamil Nadu
Tourist attractions around Erode
Buildings and structures in Erode district
Masonry dams
Buildings and structures completed in 1125